Michel Banabila (born 14 April 1961) is a Dutch composer and sound artist.

He was born in Amsterdam, Netherlands. Banabila performed live in 2013 in the auditorium of the Hirshhorn Museum, Washington, at the opening of the exhibition of Crops, an audiovisual installation with photographer Gerco de Ruijter. He performed live with media artist Geert Mul with their audiovisual set Big Data Poetry at the Logan Symposium, in the Barbican, London, in 2014 and in Yukunkun at the Global Week For Syria in Beirut, in 2015. In 2015, he also appeared at the Sonic Circuits Festival, Silver Spring, with a small modular improv set. Banabila is a member of the Disquiet Junto group. He lives with his wife and daughter in Rotterdam.

Discography
 Marilli (Eduard Vingerhoets, 1983)
 Des Traces Retrouvees (Trichord, 1984)
 VoizNoiz: Urban Sound Scapes (Steamin' Soundworks 1999)
 VoizNoiz II: Urban Sound Scapes (Tone Casualties, 2001)
 Spherics (Tone Casualties, 2001)
 Spherics II (Boudisque 2003)
 Phonema (Tapu, 2003)
 VoizNoiz 3 – Urban Jazz Scapes with Eric Vloeimans (Javaanse Jongens, 2003)
 Live-Mix (Requiem, 2005)
 Hilarious Expedition (Tapu, 2005)
 Music for Films & Documentaries (Tapu, 2007)
 0+1+0+1+0+1+0+1+0+ (Tapu, 2010)
 Changing Structures (Tapu, 2010)
 The Latest Research from the Department of Electrical Engineering (Tapu, 2011)
 In Other Words (Tapu, 2011)
 Sum Dark 12 (Tapu, 2012)
 TENT 06 & 16 & 2012 (Tapu, 2012)
 Gardening (Tapu, 2012)
 47 Voice Loops (Tapu, 2013)
 Float (Tapu, 2013)
 ZoomWorld (Tapu, 2013)
 More Research from the Same Dept. (Tapu, 2014)
 Music for Viola and Electronics I with Oene van Geel (Tapu, 2014)
 Music for Viola and Electronics II with Oene van Geel (Tapu, 2015)
 Gorlice 2014 (Tapu, 2014)
 Eyes Closed (Tapu, 2015)
 Jump Cuts (Tapu, 2015)
 Feedback + Modular + Radiowaves (Tapu, 2015)
 Feedback + Modular + Radiowaves II (Tapu, 2015)
 Feedback + Modular + Radiowaves III (Tapu, 2016)
 Earth Visitor (Tapu, 2016)
 Early Works (Bureau B, 2016)
 Sound Years (Tapu, 2017)
 New Land with Eric Vloeimans (Tapu, 2017)
 Trespassing (Séance Centre, 2017)
 Imprints (Tapu, 2018)
 Just Above the Surface (Tapu, 2018)
 Winter Sketches (Tapu, 2019)
 Uprooted (Tapu, 2019)
 Wah-Wah Whispers (Bureau B, 2021)
 Echo Transformations (Knekelhuis, 2021)

With Robin Rimbaud
 Banabila / Scanner (Steamin'Soundworks, 2010)
 Between Your Eyes And Mine (Tapu, 2013)
 The Spaces You Hold (Scanner, 2020)

With Machinefabriek
 Banabila & Machinefabriek (Tapu, 2012)
 Travelog (Tapu, 2013)
 Error Log (Tapu, 2015)
 Macrocosms (Tapu, 2016)
 Entropia (Eilean, 2019)
 Cassina (7K!, 2020)

References

External links
 
 
 

1961 births
Living people
Musicians from Amsterdam
21st-century Dutch musicians
Dutch electronic musicians
Dutch experimental musicians
Dutch sound artists